Interstate 680 (I-680) in the US state of Ohio is an auxiliary Interstate Highway passing through Youngstown. Its northern terminus is at I-80, and its southern terminus is at I-76, the Ohio Turnpike.

Route description
I-680 begins at a junction with I-80 and State Route 11 (SR 11) in Austintown. It verges southeast through a residential area in northeastern Austintown until crossing into Youngstown at milepost 2. The Interstate continues through residential areas until meeting the southern edge of Downtown Youngstown. Once leaving downtown, the roadway turns south, bound for I-76. I-680 passes through residential Boardman Township and finally Beaver Township in southern Mahoning County. Once passing the SR 164 interchange, the Interstate reaches its southern terminus at the Ohio Turnpike, allowing travel to the east on the turnpike (I-76) only.

History

Exit list

References

External links

80-6 Ohio
80-6
6 Ohio
Interstate 680